Chumaduthangi is a 1975 Indian Malayalam film,  directed by P. Bhaskaran. The film stars Prem Nazir, Sukumari, Jayabharathi and Kaviyoor Ponnamma in the lead roles. The film has musical score by V. Dakshinamoorthy.

Cast

Prem Nazir as Narendran
Sukumari as Parvathy Menon
Jayabharathi as Indu
Kaviyoor Ponnamma as Lakshmi
Adoor Bhasi
Jose Prakash as RK Menon
Prathapachandran as Doctor
Sukumaran as Reghu
Bhargavan
C. A. Balan
C. R. Lakshmi
Kunchan as Prabhu 
Pallikkara Aravindakshan
Raghava Menon
Simhalan
Sujatha as Mini
Suresh as Pradeep
Usharani as Suganthi
V. Govindankutty
Vanchiyoor Radha as Parvathy's friend

Soundtrack
The music was composed by  V. Dakshinamoorthy and the lyrics were written by P. Bhaskaran.

References

External links
 

1975 films
1970s Malayalam-language films
Films directed by P. Bhaskaran